Michael Hun Park (born April 1, 1976) is an American lawyer who serves as a United States circuit judge of the United States Court of Appeals for the Second Circuit.

Early life and career 

Park is a graduate of the Thomas Jefferson High School for Science and Technology. Park earned his Bachelor of Arts, magna cum laude, from Princeton University, and his Juris Doctor from Yale Law School in 2001, where he served as managing editor of the Yale Law Journal.

After graduating from law school, Park served as a law clerk to then-Judge Samuel Alito of the United States Court of Appeals for the Third Circuit. From 2002 to 2006, he was an associate in the New York City office of Wilmer Cutler Pickering Hale and Dorr. Park was an attorney-advisor in the United States Department of Justice Office of Legal Counsel for two years, and then again clerked for Alito during the 2008–2009 term after he became an associate justice of the Supreme Court of the United States. There, he was a co-clerk with Andy Oldham. He was counsel at Dechert from 2009 to 2011 and a partner from 2012 to 2015. From 2015 to 2019, he practiced as a name partner at the boutique litigation firm Consovoy McCarthy Park PLLC.

In 2016, Park represented the Kansas Department of Health and Environment in its effort to cut off Medicaid funding to Planned Parenthood.

Park is an adjunct professor at the Antonin Scalia Law School, where he teaches the Supreme Court Clinic. He is also an adjunct professor at Columbia Law School.

He is a member of the Board of Trustees of the Supreme Court Historical Society, the Board of Directors of Operation Exodus Inner City, and the Asian American Bar Association of New York. Park is a member of the Federalist Society.

Federal judicial service 

On October 10, 2018, President Donald Trump announced his intent to nominate Park to serve as a United States Circuit Judge of the United States Court of Appeals for the Second Circuit. Park became the second Asian Pacific American and the first Korean American to serve on the Second Circuit.  On November 13, 2018, his nomination was sent to the Senate. President Trump nominated Park to the seat vacated by Judge Gerard E. Lynch, who took senior status on September 5, 2016.

Park was on a list the Trump White House sent to Schumer and Gillibrand in July that included three other names for the US Court of Appeals for the Second Circuit, where there were two vacancies: The other names were US District Judge Richard Sullivan; Matthew McGill, a partner at the law firm Gibson, Dunn & Crutcher in Washington and Nicholas Quinn Rosenkranz, a professor at Georgetown University Law Center.

On January 3, 2019, his nomination was returned to the President under Rule XXXI, Paragraph 6 of the United States Senate. On January 23, 2019, President Trump announced his intent to renominate Park for a federal judgeship. His nomination was sent to the Senate later that day  On February 13, 2019, a hearing on his nomination was held before the Senate Judiciary Committee. On March 7, 2019, his nomination was reported out of committee by a party-line 12–10 vote. On May 8, 2019, the U.S. Senate voted to invoke cloture on his nomination by a vote of 51–43. On May 9, 2019, his nomination was confirmed by a vote of 52–41. He received his judicial commission on May 13, 2019.

Personal life 
Park is married to Sarah Seo, a legal historian and Professor of Law at Columbia Law School.

See also 
 List of Asian American jurists
 List of law clerks of the Supreme Court of the United States (Seat 8)

References

Select publications 
  (posted at Dechert)

External links 
 
 
 Bio, National Review

1976 births
Living people
21st-century American lawyers
21st-century American judges
American academics of Korean descent
American jurists of Korean descent
Federalist Society members
George Mason University School of Law faculty
Judges of the United States Court of Appeals for the Second Circuit
Law clerks of the Supreme Court of the United States
Lawyers from New York City
Lawyers from Washington, D.C.
New York (state) lawyers
New York (state) Republicans
People from Saint Paul, Minnesota
Princeton University alumni
Thomas Jefferson High School for Science and Technology alumni
United States court of appeals judges appointed by Donald Trump
United States Department of Justice lawyers
Wilmer Cutler Pickering Hale and Dorr associates
Yale Law School alumni